Avoca, New York is the name of a town and a village in Steuben County, New York:

Avoca (village), New York
Avoca (town), New York